United Nations Security Council resolution 2094, adopted unanimously on March 7, 2013, after recalling all previous relevant resolutions on the situation concerning North Korea, including resolutions 825 (1993), 1540 (2004), 1695 (2006), 1718 (2006), 1874 (2009), and 2087 (2013), the Council condemned the Democratic People's Republic of Korea's third nuclear test. Furthermore, it increased the power of other nations to enforce these sanctions.

See also
2013 Korean crisis
 List of United Nations Security Council Resolutions 2001 to 2100 (2011–present)

References

External links
Text of the Resolution at undocs.org

2013 United Nations Security Council resolutions
United Nations Security Council resolutions concerning North Korea
2013 in North Korea
March 2013 events
Sanctions against North Korea